Mỹ Tho is a city in the Tiền Giang province in the Mekong Delta region of South Vietnam. It has a population of approximately 169,000 in 2006 and 220,000 in 2012. It is the regional center of economics, education and technology. The majority ethnic group is the Kinh; minority groups include the Hoa, the Cham and the Khmer. Boat rides on the Mỹ Tho River are popular with tourists, and the city is known for hủ tiếu Mỹ Tho, a type of rice noodle soup.

History
Mỹ Tho was founded in the 1680s by Chinese refugees fleeing China after the fall of remnants of the Southern Ming to the Qing dynasty in 1683. The area, at the time, was once part of the former Khmer Empire and it was annexed to Vietnam in the 18th century. The city is named after the Mỹ Tho River.

Due to its proximity to Saigon, Mỹ Tho was the traditional gateway to the Mekong Delta. In the 17th century, the city had become one of the biggest commercial hubs in today's Southern Vietnam.

In the 1860s, Mỹ Tho, along with Saigon, was a major strategic city during the French colonial campaign towards Vietnam. In 1862, France's capture of Mỹ Tho is regarded as the conclusion to the establishment of the French colony of Cochinchina, a development that inaugurated nearly a century of French colonial dominance in Vietnam. During the colonization period, the economy continued to prosper, attracting more immigrants, mainly from Teochew and Minnan.

Mỹ Tho City is recognized as a grade II on October 7, 2005.

Administrative divisions
Mỹ Tho is divided to 11 wards (called Ward 1 - Ward 10, and Ward Tân Long) and 6 communes.

6 communes:
Đạo Thạnh
Mỹ Phong
Phước Thạnh
Tân Mỹ Chánh
Thới Sơn
Trung An
Phước Thạnh

Transportation

Mỹ Tho is connected to the rest of the country by National Route 1 and Tiền River. Here, people mainly use motorcycles, bicycles, and boats for transportation. However, it was destroyed in the 1960s.

Mỹ Tho and Bến Tre are connected by Rạch Miễu Bridge.

By river, there are many short boat trips to various islands, Bến Tre, and floating markets in the surrounding areas. It also has overnight long boats to Châu Đốc and Long Xuyên.

Climate

Tourism

Vĩnh Tràng Temple, Cao Dai Temple, Dong Tam Snake Farm. 
There are four islands in the Tien River between Mỹ Tho and Bến Tre: Dragon (Con Rong), Tortoise (Con Qui), Phoenix (Con Phung) and Unicorn (Con Lan) Islands.

The Mekong Delta is considered to be the "rice basket of Vietnam", contributing more than half of the nation's rice production. Mỹ Tho is well known as floating markets, where people sell and buy things on the river, as well as Ben Tam Ngua and Mỹ Thuận market.

Education
Mỹ Tho was the first town in southern Vietnam to have a high school. The Collège de Mỹ Tho, opened in March 1879, is now called Nguyễn Đình Chiểu High School. It was one of the first schools Vietnam had, and even now is still known for its education quality among Southern schools.

Later, another school called "School for Gifted Students of Tien Giang" opened in Mỹ Tho city. Though the total area is very limited compared to other schools in the province, the quality of education there is usually considered one of the best. The curriculum they use is modified so that students usually learn more of their core subjects than in other schools. For instance, students from a Math class do all the required materials like any other classes, more of Chemistry, Biology, and Physics because they are in the Natural Science block, and a lot more of Math. Preparation for national exams and entrance examination to the university are prioritized there.

Schools in Mỹ Tho are named with famous Vietnamese writers, poets, and national heroes such as Nguyễn Trãi, Thu Khoa Huan is also known as Nguyen Huu Huan, Xuân Diệu, Lê Ngọc Hân, Nguyễn Đình Chiểu, Trần Hưng Đạo.

Tiền Giang College which became Tiền Giang University in 2005 is also located at Mỹ Tho.

Economy
Today the economy is based on tourism, fishing, and agricultural products such as coconuts, bananas, and longans.

During World War II the French Vichy government interned foreign nationals in Mỹ Tho. In May 1945, the Japanese seized control of the camps fearing an allied attack. Foreign nationals were confined throughout the war. As the regional capital, Mỹ Tho is the main market dealing in all the produce from the region as well as fish and seafood from Mỹ Tho's large ocean-going fishing fleet. The very large and exuberant market is one of South Vietnam's biggest sources for dried fish and other dried seafood products such as Kho Muc (dried squid). At night the market is dedicated to the dealing and sorting of Mekong River fish, particularly catfish for Hồ Chí Minh City's wholesale markets. Produce, especially fruit and vegetables, is delivered by boat directly to markets. It is a popular starting point for tourists to take a boat trip on the Mekong River.

Mỹ Tho was the subject of "The Lesson", a chapter in a memoir by Tobias Wolff, In Pharaoh's Army: Memories of the Lost War, describing the events of the 1968 Tet Offensive there.

In 2010, there are total 17 markets located in wards and commune in Mỹ Tho.

Neighbouring cities
West and North: Chợ Gạo District
East: Châu Thành District, Tiền Giang
South: Tiền River and Bến Tre province

Notable people
 Nguyễn Thị Thập - Chairman of the Women's Federation of Vietnam (Hội liên hiệp phụ nữ Việt Nam) from 1956 to 1974
 General Nguyễn Khánh - former Prime Minister, General, and Ambassador of South Vietnam
 General Nguyễn Hữu Hạnh - served in the Army of the Republic of Vietnam
 Madame Thiệu, the last serving First Lady of South Vietnam from 1967 to 1975 and wife of the President of South Vietnam Nguyễn Văn Thiệu
 Trần Anh Hùng – film director and screenwriter

Gallery

References

External links

 

 
Cities in Vietnam
Districts of Tiền Giang province
Populated places in Tiền Giang province
Populated places on the Mekong River
Provincial capitals in Vietnam